Rhoda Barbara Gemignani (née Cohan; born October 21, 1940) is an American actress, best known for her recurring role as Mrs. Carmela Rossini in the American television sitcom Who's the Boss?. 

She appeared frequently on television between the 1970s to 2000s, primarily acting in comedic shows. In addition to portraying Mrs. Rossini, Gemignani had recurring roles on The Bob Newhart Show and Just Shoot Me!.

Outside of comedy, she made guest appearances in Police Woman, Kojak, The Twilight Zone, Hill Street Blues, Walker, Texas Ranger and many others. She appeared in the films Ghostbusters (1984), Three Fugitives (1989), and The Man Who Wasn't There (2001).

Career
Starting in the 1970s, Gemignani began appearing on several sitcoms, typically in small roles. Her work in this genre includes Diff'rent Strokes, The Jeffersons, Friends, Seinfeld and  The Mary Tyler Moore Show. On Full House, she originated the role of Jesse Katsopolis' mother, Irene, before being replaced by Yvonne Wilder. She had a recurring role as Mrs. Rossini in long running sitcom Who's the Boss? (1984−92), appearing across all eight of the show's seasons.

In film, Gemignani appeared as a real estate agent in Ghostbusters (1984) and played the role of Costanza in The Man Who Wasn't There (2001). As a theater actress, Gemignani portrayed Cleopatra in play Caesar and Cleopatra, Titania in William Shakespeare's comedy A Midsummer Night's Dream, and Golde in a production of musical Fiddler on the Roof.

During the 1990s she played major roles in two short-lived television shows: beautician Ruby DeMattis in sitcom Family Album and Pearl Frischetti on legal drama The Great Defender. At the turn of the millennium, she appeared as the mother of Elliot DiMauro on Just Shoot Me! (1999−2003). Gemignani provided the voice of Gladys Fairfax and two other characters in the video game SWAT 4, released in 2005. Her only acting role during the 2010s was as Mrs. LeBlanc in the sitcom Episodes.

Personal life
Gemignani was born as Rhoda Barbara Cohan on October 21, 1940 in Philadelphia, Pennsylvania, the daughter of Leo and Lillian Cohan. Her older brother, Martin Cohan, was a comedy writer who co-created Who's the Boss?. Gemignani attended San Francisco State College. She married theater composer Paul Gemignani in 1961, though they later divorced.

Partial filmography
Die Laughing (1980) - Russian ticket taker
Ghostbusters (1984) - Real Estate Woman
Three Fugitives (1989) - Radio Operator
Rock Hudson (1990) - TV Producer
Carlo's Wake (1999) - Aunt Betty
 Foe Pows (2000) - Mama Mia
The Man Who Wasn't There (2001) - Costanza

References

External links

1940 births
Living people
Actresses from Philadelphia
American television actresses
American film actresses
20th-century American actresses
21st-century American actresses